Jannez is a dansband from Laxsjö, Sweden, established in 1976 as Stars orkester.

In September 1996, the band scored a Svensktoppen hit for two weeks with the song De blindas café.

Jannez participated at Dansbandskampen 2008, performing Paul Paljett's 1977 song Guenerina.

Discography

Albums 
1989: Härliga tider - strålande tider!
1994: Någonstans i mitt hjärta
2001: Någonsdans i Sverige
2009: Guenerina
2010: Se på oss nu
2011: É skiiv ma bäre gammaldans...
2014: Blixt från klablå himmel

Svensktoppen songs 
"De blindas café" - 1996

References

External links
Official website

1976 establishments in Sweden
Dansbands
Jämtland
Musical groups established in 1976